is a passenger railway station in the city of Funabashi, Chiba Prefecture, Japan, operated by the private railway operator Keisei Electric Railway.

Lines
Keisei-Nishifuna Station is served by the Keisei Main Line, and is located 22.2 km from the terminus of the line at Keisei Ueno Station.

Station layout
The station has two opposed side platforms connected via a footbridge to a station building.

Platforms

History
It was renamed Keisei-Nishifuna on 1 April 1987.

Station numbering was introduced to all Keisei Line stations on 17 July 2010. Higashi Nakayama was assigned station number KS20.

Passenger statistics
In fiscal 2019, the station was used by an average of 10,934 passengers daily.

Surrounding areas
Nishi-Funabashi Station
It takes about 7 minutes from here to Nishi-Funabashi Station on foot or about 3 minutes by riding on route buses below.

Buses
Keisei-Nishifuna bus stop which is bound for suburb is located due south of the station. It takes about 2 minutes on foot.
Keisei-Nishifuna bus stop which is bound for Nishi-Funabashi Station is located due north of the station. It takes about 1 minutes on foot.

See also
 List of railway stations in Japan

References

External links

 Keisei station information 

Railway stations in Japan opened in 1916
Railway stations in Chiba Prefecture
Keisei Main Line
Funabashi